Limestone Lake is a lake located on Vancouver Island west of Buttle Lake in Strathcona Provincial Park.

References

Alberni Valley
Lakes of Vancouver Island
Lakes of British Columbia
Nootka Land District